Ahmad Rabaie is a Palestinian politician and diplomat, was born in the city of Dura in the Hebron Governorate in 1964. He was appointed as Ambassador Extraordinary of the State of Palestine to Pakistan in 2019.

Political and diplomatic life 

 Appointed as Ambassador Extraordinary and Plenary of the State of Palestine to Pakistan
 Assistant Secretary General of the Council of Arab Interior Ministers
 Assistant Minister of Interior and Director General of Arab and International Relations

Education 

 PhD in Law and Political Sciences (University of Tunis El Manar, Tunisia).
 M.A. in Strategic Planning and State Administration (Mutah University, the Hashemite Kingdom of Jordan)
Diploma of Higher Studies in National Resources Management (National Defense College, the Hashemite Kingdom of Jordan).

 B.A. in Management (Al-Quds University, the State of Palestine).
 Diploma in Criminal and Security Sciences (Institute of Competency Upgrading and Capacity Development, the Russian Federation).
 Civil Engineering (Palestine Polytechnic University, the State of Palestine).

External links

References

People from Dura, Hebron
Tunis El Manar University alumni
Al-Quds University alumni
Ambassadors of the State of Palestine to Pakistan
Palestinian civil engineers
1964 births
Palestine Polytechnic University alumni
Living people